The Knickerbocker Rules are a set of baseball rules formalized by William R. Wheaton and William H. Tucker of the Knickerbocker Base Ball Club in 1845. They have previously been considered to be the basis for the rules of the modern game, although this is disputed. The rules are informally known as the "New York style" of baseball, as opposed to other variants such as the "Massachusetts Game" and "Philadelphia town ball".

Dispute
Modern scholarship has cast doubt on the originality of these rules, as information has come to light about the New York clubs that predated the Knickerbockers, in particular the rules devised by William R. Wheaton for the Gotham Club in 1837.  Baseball historian Jeffrey Kittel has concluded that none of the Knickerbocker Rules of 1845 was original, with the possible exception of three-out innings. Nonetheless, the Knickerbocker Rules are enormously significant for baseball historians because they are the earliest extant rules from which the evolution of modern baseball can be lineally traced, and whether or not they can claim to be "first," certainly describe the kind of game played by the New York-area amateur clubs from which the modern game developed.

The rules
Several of the rules are still around in some form today, while others are in direct contrast to current rules.  A few of the more interesting examples are shown below.  The list as presented, except for the commentary, is taken directly from the "Rules" as published in the 1860 Beadle's Dime Base Ball Player, edited by Henry Chadwick (website below):

4th. The bases shall be from "home" to second base, forty-two paces; from first to third base, forty-two paces, equidistant.
If a pace is taken to be 3 feet, that works out to  diagonally across the square that makes up the infield, or 89.1 feet between consecutive bases (the corners of the square). On the other hand, all contemporary sources, such as Noah Webster's dictionary, define a "pace" as 2-1/2 feet, which would make the bases approximately 75 feet apart. The first rule which definitively established the basepaths at 30 yards (90 feet) was enacted by the Convention of 1857.

8th. The game to consist of twenty-one counts, or aces; but at the conclusion an equal number of hands must be played.
These original terms are recognizably card-playing jargon. The winner was the first team to score 21 "aces" (now called "runs," a cricket term), after an equal number of turns at bat or "hands". This rule, in combination with Rule 15, determined the length of the game in general. The game is now defined to be a certain number of "innings," another cricket term. In theory, a baseball game could be completed after just one inning, as long as one team scored the requisite 21 runs.
The standard game length of nine innings was introduced in 1857. However, there are many circumstances in which baseball games, and variants such as softball, are shorter (or longer) than nine.

9th. The ball must be pitched, not thrown, for the bat.
The ball had to be literally "pitched," like a horseshoe. Overhand pitching in baseball was not allowed until 1884, although the progression from underhand to overhand was gradual, and pitchers stretched the limits of the rule by increasing speed and developing movement from the underhand position.
Note, however, that there was not yet a rule specifying precisely where the pitcher had to stand and deliver the ball.

10th. A ball knocked out of the field, or outside the range of the first and third base, is foul.
In most (but not all) versions of early baseball or town-ball, as in rounders and cricket, there was no foul territory and every batted ball was "fair" no matter its direction. 
A ball knocked between the baselines and beyond the field was not initially a home run but a foul, to be ignored (after finding the ball). This was largely a moot issue, as the early ball fields had very deep fences (if any) and an over-the-fence knock was an unlikely event.
Foul balls were not initially "strikes." Many years later, when it became clear that a batter might hit foul balls endlessly in an effort to get a good pitch to hit, the pitcher was given a break by a rule (NL 1901, AL 1903) that declared any foul ball to be a strike unless there were already two strikes on the batter. After the bunt came into existence as a strategy, it became clear that a batter could literally bunt all day to try to get his pitch. To retain some balance, the rule was amended, in 1894, to declare any foul bunt a strike.
Note the colloquial term "knock", suggestive of the sound made when bat meets ball, and which is still used as a synonym; for example, a "base hit" is sometimes called a "base knock."

11th. Three balls being struck at and missed and the last one caught, is a hand-out; if not caught it is considered fair, and the striker bound to run.
"For it's one, two, three strikes, you're out!" is an ancient rule. The added detail, that a batter ("striker") can try to run to first on a missed third strike, also exists today, except that if there are fewer than two outs and first base is occupied, the batter is automatically out. This is to preclude the catcher dropping the ball on purpose to set up force plays — the same idea behind the infield fly rule.
Note the lack of reference to the strike zone, called strikes, or the concept of a "ball" or a "base on balls." Those adjustments developed over time to counter "ungentlemanly" strategies, and hurry the game up:
Patient batters would refuse to swing at any pitch they did not like, and delay the game. The concept of the  "called" strike - originally an unsportsmanlike conduct penalty for persistent refusal to swing, after being duly warned - was introduced in 1858. 
Over-cautious pitchers would throw the ball wide, and delay the game, or alternatively throw at the batter in an effort to intimidate. The called "ball" was introduced in 1863, as a parallel to the called-strike rule: a penalty the umpire could impose, after a warning and multiple offenses, for a persistent failure to deliver "good balls," along with a limit on how many the pitcher could deliver before the batter was automatically awarded first base. The number of balls constituting a "base on balls" was initially three. It was tinkered with through the years (to as high as 9) until the count of four was settled upon in 1889.
Note that this meant that many pitches had no effect at all; it would be years before the modern view took hold in which every pitch results in either a swing, a called strike or a ball. Through the 1860s and into the '70s many umpires were reluctant to impose the penalty calls, with their implication of unsportsmanlike conduct, and some were criticized for being overzealous with them.
The strike zone did not come into being until 1887; before that season, it was left to the umpire's judgement whether a pitch was "good" or "unfair." 
Foul balls were also not considered strikes initially, as discussed under rule 10.

12th. If a ball be struck, or tipped, and caught, either flying or on the first bound, it is a hand out.
Catching a fair ball on the first bounce counted as an out until the 1865 season. Catching a foul bound for an out persisted until 1883. This was before gloves were used (or allowed), and obviously it was easier to catch that hard ball on the first bounce. This also provided the game with some balance, as the underlying assumption in Rule 8 is that many runs were likely to be scored. Also, the catcher played well back of the plate, for safety reasons, the various protective gear not having been developed yet.

13th. A player running the bases shall be out, if the ball is in the hands of an adversary on the base, or the runner is touched with it before he makes his base; it being understood, however, that in no instance is a ball to be thrown at him.
The important part of the rule is not allowing a player to be put out by hitting him with the ball. This was sometimes called "soaking" or "plugging" the runner. One schoolyard version of the game, kickball, using a large inflated ball, still allows players to be put out by hitting them (below the head area) with this much-softer ball. 
Note that under this rule a runner could be put out by tagging the base he was attempting to reach whether he was "forced" or not; an 1848 amendment limited this practice to first base only. The modern force-out at the other bases appeared in 1854.

15th. Three hands out, all out.
Three outs per half-inning, a novel rule. Earlier forms of townball and related games were either "all out, all out" as in cricket, or "one-out, all out" (any putout ends the team's at-bat). Referring again to card-playing terminology, a "hand" is now called an "at-bat", or more generally, the progression of a specific batter and/or runner, at bat and/or around the bases.
This is a fundamental difference from baseball's cousin, cricket, in which all of the batsmen take their respective turns at bat in a single innings.

16th. Players must take their strike in regular turn.
Specifies that the batting order is fixed. Another ancient rule that still applies to the modern game.

18th. No ace or base can be made on a foul strike.
States that the batter and baserunners do not advance on a foul ball (a foul having been defined in Rule 10). Another rule that still applies to the modern game.

20th. But one base allowed when a ball bounds out of the field when struck.
Outfields in the early days were assumed to be boundless, in general. The only "home run" was a literal dash around the bases, on a ball hit between outfielders. However, since there was often only minimal foul territory, with spectators practically standing on the foul lines, it was not uncommon for fair balls to bounce into the crowd; and in such cases the rule is still in effect, although invoked very rarely given modern seating arrangements.
This rule was superseded, with respect to the far playing boundary, not later than 1876: a ball which cleared the outfield fence in fair ground, whether on the fly or on the bounce, was now a home run. The so-called "ground rule double" (it is not, properly, a ground rule), awarding two bases when the ball bounces over the outfield fence, was introduced in 1929 (AL) and 1931 (NL).
However, to this day one base is awarded if a defensive error sends the ball out of play.

See also
New York Knickerbockers
William Wheaton

Notes
The Encyclopedia of Baseball, published by MacMillan, 1969, and subsequent editions
Official Baseball Rules, various years
The Dickson Baseball Dictionary, edited by Paul Dickson
Baseball guides and annuals

References

External links
Knickerbocker Rules – a list of the 20 rules
Early evolution of the rules
Collection of early baseball rules

History of baseball in the United States
Baseball rules
Baseball genres
Ball and bat games

de:Knickerbocker Rules